Sudhan Gali (سدھن گلی; also called as Dera Sadozai), meaning the "Street of Sudhans", "Sudhan Street") is a village located in Bagh District, Azad Kashmir. It lies on the main road that connects the district Bagh to Muzaffarabad, the capital of Azad Kashmir and also connects the town of Chikkar with Bagh city.The famous hill station Ganga choti is about 5km from Sudhan Gali. It is located at an altitude of 7000 feet.

Tourism
This beautiful, scenic place attracts hundreds of tourists from all over Azad Kashmir and Pakistan. There are two guest houses for tourists, which are constructed very beautifully and attract large number of people each summer. However, these houses are occupied mostly by well known, well connected, and influential people and are not available most of the times for common tourists due to lack of a transparent system that would accommodate ordinary tourists.

Sudhan Gali is famous for its hiking trails that lead to Ganga Choti (Peak), a mountain peak about 9989 feet (3044 m) feet high which is one of the most famous tourist attractions in AJK, Pakistan.

Forests
Sudhan Gali is also home to some of the rarest forests in the region containing pine trees that are hundreds of years old. Due to lack of knowledge and interest, these forests are now endangered to become extinct as locals continue deforestation by cutting down trees yet local and state governments seem to have no interest in saving them.

Sports
There is a cricket ground near the Ganga Peak known as Ser Ground, located between two mountains. It is not very large but looks very beautiful. Every June a cricket tournament is held there in which sixteen teams of District Bagh and Muzafarabad participate.

2005 earthquake

Ganga Chotti (a mountain peak near Sudhan Gali) was badly affected by the 2005 Pakistan earthquake. In December 2005 the United Nations Children's Fund arrived to deliver clothing before the snows of winter arrived. UNICEF focused their relief efforts on places at high altitudes like Sudhan Gali (which has an altitude of 2,134 metres).

According to UNICEF:

Before the earthquake it had been used as a base camp for hikers and trekkers for the Ganga Choti mountain which lies nearby.

People of Sudhan Gali are very educated and the literacy rate is about 89% despite shortage of basic needs.

References

Populated places in Bagh District